Ballinagh, officially Bellananagh, is a village in County Cavan, Ireland. It lies on the N55 midlands route.

Buildings of note
Ballinagh Market House is a five-bay two-storey building constructed in 1821; it is currently in use as a store house. It was designed by Arthur McClean who also designed the market houses at nearby Ballyjamesduff and at Balbriggan in north County Dublin.

Transport
Local Link Cavan Monaghan Route C2 links the village with Cavan and Cavan General Hospital eight times daily Monday to Thursday, eleven times daily Friday and Saturday, and five times daily on Sunday.

Ballinagh is also served by various Bus Éireann routes. Route 111A serves Ballinagh four times daily Monday to Saturday, and once daily on Sunday, linking it to Cavan as well as to Granard, Castlepollard and Delvin, with onward connections in Delvin to Route 111 for Athboy, Trim and Dublin. Route 466 provides several daily journeys to Athlone. Route 65 provides a once daily service Monday to Saturday to Longford and Athlone, as well as Cavan, Clones and Monaghan, with onward connections in Monaghan to Ulsterbus Route 271 for Armagh and Belfast; in addition to a once daily service to Cavan as well as to Longford and Galway on Friday and Sunday. Route 465 provides a once weekly service on Tuesdays to Cavan as well as Losset, Arvagh, Killeshandra, Ballyconnell and Carrigallen.

Sport
Ballinagh GAA is the local Gaelic Athletic Association club. In 2007, Ballinagh won the Ulster Intermediate Football Championship, becoming the first Cavan club side to ever win a provincial title. In 2013, the club won the Cavan Senior Football Championship for the first in their 125-year history.

See also
 List of towns and villages in Ireland
 Market Houses in Ireland

References

Towns and villages in County Cavan